Sward or Swärd may refer to:

Christian Swärd (born 1987), professional Swedish ice hockey player
Marcia P. Sward (1939–2008), American mathematician and nonprofit organization administrator
Melinda Sward (born 1979), American actress known for her portrayal of Pretty Crane on the NBC daytime soap opera Passions
Robert Sward (born 1933), American and Canadian poet and novelist

Sward can also refer to the dense vegetation of an area of grassland or meadow.